A whirlpool is a body of rotating water produced by opposing currents or a current running into an obstacle. Small whirlpools form when a bath or a sink is draining. More powerful ones formed in seas or oceans may be called maelstroms. Vortex is the proper term for a whirlpool that has a downdraft.

In narrow ocean straits with fast flowing water, whirlpools are often caused by tides. Many stories tell of ships being sucked into a maelstrom, although only smaller craft are actually in danger. Smaller whirlpools appear at river rapids and can be observed downstream of artificial structures such as weirs and dams. Large cataracts, such as Niagara Falls, produce strong whirlpools.

Notable whirlpools

Saltstraumen 

It has one of the strongest tidal currents in the world.

Moskstraumen 

Moskstraumen or Moske-stroom is an unusual system of whirlpools in the open seas in the Lofoten Islands off the Norwegian coast. This is supposedly the whirlpool depicted in Olaus Magnus's map, labeled as "Horrenda Caribdis" (Charybdis).

The Moskstraumen is formed by the combination of powerful semi-diurnal tides and the unusual shape of the seabed, with a shallow ridge between the Moskenesøya and Værøy islands which amplifies and whirls the tidal currents.

Poe described this phenomenon in his short story "A Descent into the Maelström", which in 1841 was the first to use the word maelstrom in the English language; in this story related to the Lofoten Maelstrom, two fishermen are swallowed by the maelstrom while one survives.

Corryvreckan 

The Corryvreckan is a narrow strait between the islands of Jura and Scarba, in Argyll and Bute, on the northern side of the Gulf of Corryvreckan, Scotland. It is the third-largest whirlpool in the world. Though it was classified initially as non-navigable by the Royal Navy it was later categorized as "extremely dangerous".

A documentary team from Scottish independent producers Northlight Productions once threw a mannequin into the Corryvreckan ("the Hag") with a high-visibility vest and depth gauge.

Other notable maelstroms and whirlpools 

Old Sow whirlpool is located between Deer Island, New Brunswick, Canada, and Moose Island, Eastport, Maine, USA. The smaller whirlpools around this Old Sow are known as "Piglets".

Skookumchuck Narrows is a tidal rapids that develops whirlpools, on the Sunshine Coast, Canada with speeds of the current exceeding .

French Pass is a narrow and treacherous stretch of water that separates D'Urville Island from the north end of the South Island of New Zealand. In 2000 a whirlpool there caught student divers, resulting in fatalities.

A short-lived whirlpool sucked in a portion of the  Lake Peigneur in Louisiana, United States after a drilling mishap on November 20, 1980. This was not a naturally occurring whirlpool, but a disaster caused by underwater drillers breaking through the roof of a salt mine. This mishap resulted in the destruction of five houses, the loss of nineteen barges and eight tug boats, oil rigs, a mobile home, trees, acres of land, and most of a botanical garden. The adjacent settlement of Jefferson Island was reduced in area by 10%. Nine of the barges, which had sunk, later resurfaced after the whirlpool subsided.

A more recent example of an artificial whirlpool that received significant media coverage occurred in early June 2015, when an intake vortex formed in Lake Texoma, on the Oklahoma–Texas border, near the floodgates of the dam that forms the lake. At the time of the whirlpool's formation, the lake was being drained after reaching its highest level ever. The Army Corps of Engineers, which operates the dam and lake, expected that the whirlpool would last until the lake reached normal seasonal levels by late July.

Dangers 

Powerful whirlpools have killed unlucky seafarers, but their power tends to be exaggerated by laymen. One of the few reports of large ships ever being sucked into a whirlpool is from the fourteenth-century Mali Empire ruler Mansa Musa, as reported by a contemporary, Al-Umari:

Tales like those by Paul the Deacon, Edgar Allan Poe, and Jules Verne are entirely fictional.

However, temporary whirlpools caused by major engineering disasters, such as the Lake Peigneur disaster, have been recorded as capable of submerging medium-sized watercraft such as barges and tugboats.

In literature and popular culture 
Besides Poe and Verne, another literary source is of the 1500s, Olaus Magnus, a Swedish bishop, who had stated that a maelstrom more powerful than the one written about in the Odyssey sucked in ships, which sank to the bottom of the sea, and even whales were pulled in. Pytheas, the Greek historian, also mentioned that maelstroms swallowed ships and threw them up again.

The monster Charybdis of Greek mythology was later rationalized as a whirlpool, which sucked entire ships into its fold in the narrow coast of Sicily, a disaster faced by navigators.

During the 8th century, Paul the Deacon, who had lived among the Belgii, described tidal bores and the maelstrom for a Mediterranean audience unused to such violent tidal surges:

Three of the most notable literary references to the Lofoten Maelstrom date from the nineteenth century. The first is a short story by Edgar Allan Poe named "A Descent into the Maelström" (1841). The second is 20,000 Leagues Under the Sea (1870), a novel by Jules Verne. At the end of this novel, Captain Nemo seems to commit suicide, sending his Nautilus submarine into the Maelstrom (although in Verne's sequel Nemo and the Nautilus were seen to have survived). The "Norway maelstrom" is also mentioned in Herman Melville's Moby-Dick.

In the Life of St Columba, the author, Adomnan of Iona, attributes to the saint miraculous knowledge of a particular bishop who sailed into a whirlpool off the coast of Ireland. In Adomnan's narrative, he quotes Columba saying

The Corryvreckan whirlpool plays a key role in the 1945 Powell and Pressburger film I Know Where I'm Going!. Joan Webster (Wendy Hiller) is determined to get to the fictional Isle of Kiloran and marry her fiancé. Dangerous weather delays her crossing, and her determination becomes desperation when she realizes that she is falling in love with Torquil MacNeil (Roger Livesey). Against the advice of experienced folk, she offers a young fisherman a huge sum of money to take her over. At the last moment, Torquil steps into the boat, and after a squall knocks the engine out of commission, they face the whirlpool. Torquil manages to repair the engine before the tide turns, and they return to the mainland. This part of the picture uses footage Powell filmed, while tied to a mast to leave both hands free for the camera, at Corryvreckan, incorporated into scenes shot in a huge tank at the studio.

In the movie Pirates of the Caribbean: At World's End, the final battle between the Black Pearl and the Flying Dutchman takes place with both ships sailing inside a giant whirlpool which appears to be over a kilometer wide and several hundred meters deep.

Etymology 
One of the earliest uses in English of the Scandinavian word malström or malstrøm was by Edgar Allan Poe in his short story "A Descent into the Maelström" (1841). The Nordic word itself is derived from the Dutch word maelstrom (modern spelling ), from malen ('to mill' or 'to grind') and stroom ('stream'), to form the meaning 'grinding current' or literally 'mill-stream', in the sense of milling (grinding) grain.

See also 

 Coriolis effect
 Eddy (fluid dynamics)
 Rip current

References

Further reading 
 Baron PA, Willeke K (1986) Respirable droplets from whirlpools: measurements of size distribution and estimation of disease potential. Environ Res 39, 8–18.

External links 
 The Demopolis Lock whirlpools - a powerful artificial whirlpool

 Research articles on whirlpools and related topics by Hubert Chanson, Department of Civil Engineering, The University of Queensland

Natural hazards
Vortices